The 2011 McDonald's All-American Girls Game is an All-star basketball game that was played on Wednesday, March 30, 2011 at the United Center in Chicago, Illinois, home of the Chicago Bulls. The game's rosters featured the best and most highly recruited high school girls graduating in 2011.  The game is the 10th annual version of the McDonald's All-American Game first played in 2002.

2011 Game
All-star games are typically showcases for offense, not defense, but the 2011 event featured a defense described as vigorous. Not coincidentally, one of the players, Elizabeth Williams, who would go on to win the Most Outstanding Player award, likes to play defense. Despite her interest in defense, it was her offense that helped earn the award. With minutes left in the game, and a comfortable lead, the East coach pulled the starters, including Williams, to give the crowd a chance to applaud their performance. However, one of her teammates pointed out that her 22 points was a single point shy of the McDonald's scoring record. She was re-inserted in the game, and with 42 seconds left, scored on a layup to set the scoring record. The East team won the game 78–66.

2011 East Roster

2011 West Roster

Coaches
The East team was coached by:
 Head Coach Mary Coyle Klinger of Rutgers Preparatory School (Somerset, New Jersey)
 Asst Coach Anthony Pappas of Waterloo West High School (Waterloo, Iowa)
 Asst Coach Teri Morison of Carroll High School (Grapevine, Texas)

The West team was coached by:
 Head Coach Dorothy Gaters of Marshall High School (Chicago, Illinois)
 Asst Coach Gwen Howard of Marshall High School (Chicago, Illinois)
 Asst Coach Courtney Hargrays of Marshall High School (Chicago, Illinois)

All-American Week

Schedule 

 Monday, March 28: Powerade Jamfest
 Slam Dunk Contest
 Three-Point Shoot-out
 Timed Basketball Skills Competition
 Wednesday, March 30: Girls All-American Game

Contest Winners

See also
2011 McDonald's All-American Boys Game

References

External links
McDonald's All-American on the web

2011 in American women's basketball
2011